Volleyball for both men and women was contested    in the 2017 Summer Deaflympics from July 19-July 28. Hasan Doğan Sports Hall and Mustafa Dağıstanlı Sports Hall were selected as the venues for hosting the volleyball matches.

In the Men's volleyball, hosts Turkey defeated Ukraine in the final to clinch the gold medal and in the Women's volleyball Japan defeated Italy to claim the gold medal.

8 teams each for both Men's Volleyball and Women's Volleyball were qualified to play in the Group matches

Medal summary

Medalists

Indoor volleyball

Beach volleyball

Men's indoor competition

Group stage

Group A

Group B

Knockout stage

Elimination
<onlyinclude>

Classification

Women's indoor competition

Group stage

Group A

Group B

Knockout stage

Elimination
<onlyinclude>

Classification

References

External links 
beach volleyball
Beach Volleyball pdf
Volleyball
Volleyball pdf

Deaflympics
International volleyball competitions hosted by Turkey
2017 Summer Deaflympics